Enigmaticolus nipponensis is a species of sea snail, a marine gastropod mollusc in the family Eosiphonidae, the true whelks and their allies.

Description
The length of the shell attains 63.7 mm.

Distribution
This marine species occurs off Madagascar and in the Okinawa Trough

References

 Fraussen K. 2008. Enigmaticolus, a new genus of deep water buccinids (Gastropoda: Buccinidae) with description of a new species from Madagascar. Gloria Maris, 46(4-5): 74-82
 Okutani T. & Fujiwara Y. (2000). Gastropod fauna of a thermal vent site on the North Knoll of Iheya Ridge, Okinawa Trough. Venus 59(2) : 123-128

External links
 Zhang S.-Q. [Shuqian, Zhang S.-P. [Suping] & Chen H. [Hao]. (2020). Enigmaticolus inflatus sp. nov., a new buccinid species from a methane seep area in the South China Sea (Gastropoda: Neogastropoda). Zootaxa. 4728(3): 385-389.]
 Chen C. [Ching, Xu T. [Ting], Fraussen K. & Qiu J.-W. [Jian-Wen]. (2020). Integrative taxonomy of enigmatic deep-sea true whelks in the sister-genera Enigmaticolus and Thermosipho (Gastropoda: Buccinidae). Zoological Journal of the Linnean Society. DOI: 10.1093/zoolinnean/zlaa134: 20 pp]

Eosiphonidae
Gastropods described in 2008